Namirembe may refer to any of the following:

Namirembe Hill - One of the original seven hills that formed the city of Kampala, Uganda, at the time of its founding in the late 1800s
Namirembe Cathedral - The Provincial Cathedral of the Church of Uganda and the diocesan cathedral for Namirembe Diocese.
Namirembe Bitamazire - Ugandan educator and politician. Former Minister of Education and Sports in Uganda, from 1979 until 1980 and from 2005 until 2011. 
Namirembe Hospital - The alternative name for Mengo Hospital
Namirembe Hill Side High School - A high school in Kampala, Uganda's capital city.